Sybaris was an important city of Magna Graecia. It was situated in modern Calabria, in southern Italy, between two rivers, the Crathis (Crati) and the Sybaris (Coscile).

The city was founded in 720 BC by Achaean and Troezenian settlers. Sybaris amassed great wealth thanks to its fertile land and busy port. Its inhabitants became famous among the Greeks for their hedonism, feasts, and excesses, to the extent that "sybarite" and "sybaritic" have become bywords for opulence, luxury, and outrageous pleasure-seeking.

In 510/509 BC the city was subjugated by its neighbor Kroton and its population driven out. Sybaris became a dependent ally of Kroton, but Kroton again besieged the city in 476/475 BC, probably resulting in another victory for Kroton. Two attempts to reoccupy the city failed around 452/451 BC and 446/445 BC when the remaining Sybarites were again expelled by the Krotoniates. After a call for help the Sybarites reoccupied their city later in 446/445 BC with the assistance of new settlers from Athens and other cities in the Peloponnese. This coexistence did not last long: the Sybarites got into a conflict with the new colonists and were ousted for the last time in the summer of 445 BC. In sum, the city saw a total of five periods of occupation separated by expulsion. The new settlers then proceeded to found the city of Thurii in 444/443 BC, a new colony which was built partially on top of the site of Sybaris. The surviving Sybarites founded Sybaris on the Traeis.

The ruins of Sybaris and Thurii became forgotten as they were buried by sediment from the Crati river. The ruins were rediscovered and excavated in the 1960s by Donald Freeman Brown. Today they can be found southeast of Sibari, a frazione in the comune of Cassano allo Ionio in the Province of Cosenza, Calabria region, Italy.

Geography 
Strabo and Diodorus Siculus write that the city was situated close to the sea and lay between the Crathis and Sybaris rivers (from which the city derives its name). Most modern research places the city on a coastal ridge near a wetland lagoon. In the present the rivers are known as the Crati and Coscile. Today the Coscile feeds into the Crati about five kilometers from its mouth, which then passes just south of the archaeological site of the city. When Sybaris was still populated the Coscile pursued a direct course into the Gulf of Taranto, probably at a short distance to the north. The city lay on a plain that was renowned for its fertility.

History

Foundation in 720 BC 
Sybaris was founded in 720 BC according to Pseudo-Scymnus. Strabo mentions it was an Achaean colony and that its oekist (founder) was Is  of Helice, a city in Achaea. Aristotle writes the Achaeans were accompanied by a number of Troezenian citizens, but they were eventually expelled by the more numerous Achaeans. According to legend the city was founded by Sagaris, the son of Oïlean Ajax.

The authenticity of the name of the oekist is uncertain. Strabo is the only source for the name of the oekist, which might be a corruption of [Sagar]is or [Sybar]is. Further complicating the issue is the appearance of the letters Wiis on coins of Poseidonia. This has been interpreted as a confirmation of Strabo's account because Poseidonia is thought to be a colony of Sybaris.

Prosperity in the 7th and 6th century BC 

Diodorus Siculus describes how Sybaris had amassed great wealth and a huge population as a result of its fertile farming land and its policy of admitting aliens to its citizenry. He calls it the largest city in Italy and states that it had 300,000 inhabitants. This number of inhabitants was certainly exaggerated  but Sybaris was nonetheless a linchpin of Magna Graecia. Ephorus gives a figure of 100,000 inhabitants, which is perhaps closer to the truth. Strabo writes that its inhabitants on the Crathis occupied a circuit of fifty stadia (over ). Furthermore, he explains that Sybaris was a dominant power in the region which ruled over four tribes and twenty-five subject cities.

The Oenotrian city Pandosia was one of the settlements which seems to have been controlled by Sybaris. In the second half of the seventh century BC the Sybarites apparently took over the sanctuary of Athena on the Timpone della Motta from the Oenotrians. They celebrated large festivals regularly on this hill, which was located 15 kilometers to the northwest of their city. Sybaris extended its dominion across the peninsula to the Tyrrhenian Sea, where it is thought to have founded its colonies Poseidonia, Laüs and Scidrus. Poseidonia was founded in approximately 600 BC, but it is unknown when the latter two colonies were founded.

Descriptions of the wealth and luxury of Sybaris are plenty in the ancient literature. Smindyrides was a prominent citizen who is claimed by Herodotus to have surpassed all other men in refined luxury. Diodorus describes him as the wealthiest suitor for the daughter of Cleisthenes of Sicyon. He sailed from Sybaris to Sicyon in a ship of fifty oars manned by his own slaves and surpassed even Cleisthenes himself in luxury. Athenaeus makes the claim that his entourage consisted of a thousand slaves, fishermen, bird-catchers and cooks. However, his information must be false because he claims to cite Herodotus, who does not mention such a number. Claudius Aelianus even alleges that Smyndirides could not sleep on a bed of rose petals because it gave him blisters. Another Sybarite who is known by name is Alcimenes. A Pseudo-Aristotle mentions that it was said he dedicated a very expensive cloak as a votive offering at the temple of Lacinian Hera. Here Athenaeus distorts the information too: he treats the story as genuine rather than hearsay and attributes it to the real Aristotle.

Justin mentions an alliance of Sybaris with the other Achaean colonies Metapontum and Kroton against the Ionian colony Siris. This resulted in the conquest of Siris in the middle of the sixth century BC. In the second half of the sixth century BC Sybaris started minting its first coins, of which the oldest have been dated to approximately 530 BC. These coins employed the Achaean weight standard which was shared with the other Achaean colonies Kroton, Caulonia and Metapontum.

Ancient patent law 

One of the first documented intellectual property laws similar to modern patent laws is thought to have been enacted in the 6th century BC in Sybaris, to protect culinary creations of chefs or bakers for a period of 1 year.

Subjugation by Kroton in 510/509 BC 
Diodorus Siculus writes that the oligarchic government of the city was overthrown in 510/509 BC by a popular leader named Telys (Herodotus describes him as a tyrant). He persuaded the Sybarites to exile the 500 richest citizens and confiscate their wealth. The exiled citizens took refuge at the altars of Kroton. Telys demanded the Krotoniates return the exiles under threat of war. The Krotoniates were inclined to surrender the exiles to avoid war, but Pythagoras convinced them to protect the suppliants. As a consequence the Sybarites marched with 300,000 men upon the Krotoniates, whose army led by Milo numbered 100,000. The army sizes given by Diodorus (shared with Strabo) must have been even more exaggerated than the population size. Even though they were greatly outnumbered, the Krotoniates won the battle and took no prisoners, killing most of the Sybarites. After their victory they plundered and razed Sybaris. According to Strabo either two months or nine days elapsed between the battle and the sack. Most likely the Sybarites executed Telys and his supporters during this time.

Walter Burkert questions the veracity of the account given by Diodorus Siculus. It would have been illogical for Telys to banish his opponents first and then to demand their return. He argues that the elements of the story resemble fictional tragedies. The version of Herodotus is more brief and doesn't involve Pythagoras, but does claim that the Krotoniates received help from Dorieus. Strabo claims that the Krotoniates diverted the course of the river Crathis to submerge Sybaris.

The Crati transports coarse sand and pebbles in its channel. If Strabo's claim is true, that material would have been deposited as sediment above the city when the river submerged it. An analysis of core samples taken from the site did not find such river deposits directly above the former city. The burial of Sybaris more likely resulted from natural processes such as fluvial overbank alluviation.

Continued struggle with Kroton 

After its destruction the surviving inhabitants took refuge at their colonies Laüs and Scidrus. It is assumed some also fled to Poseidonia, because in the early fifth century Poseidonia's coins adopted the Achaean weight standard and the bull seen on Sybarite coins. A. J. Graham thinks it was plausible that the number of refugees was large enough for some kind of synoecism to have occurred between the Poseidonians and the Sybarites, possibly in the form of a sympolity. Sybaris was not completely destroyed, as Diodorus and Strabo claimed, but became a dependent "ally" of Kroton. "Alliance" coins show the tripod symbol of Kroton on one side and the bull symbol of Sybaris on the other side. Literary evidence from Aristoxenus attests of Pythagoreans who apparently moved to Sybaris after its subjugation by Kroton.

Diodorus Siculus mentions that Kroton besieged Sybaris again in 476/475 BC. The Sybarites appealed to the tyrant Hiero I of Syracuse for help. Hiero put his brother Polyzelos in command of an army to relieve the Sybarites, expecting that he would be killed by the Krotoniates. Polyzelos suspected this, refused to lead the campaign and took refuge with the tyrant Theron of Acragas. Diodorus makes no further mention of Hiero's plan to relieve Sybaris, indicating that the Sybarites were defeated again. However, according to Timaeus and two scholia Polyzelos was successful in relieving the siege of Sybaris and fled to Acragas later when he was accused of plotting revolution.

Regardless of the results of the siege of 476 BC, it seems the Sybarites had to leave their city at some point between that year and 452/451 BC. Diodorus writes that the Sybarites refounded their city at its former site in 452/451 BC under the leadership of a Thessalian. It is thought that Poseidonia had a major share in this because the coins of the new city have a great resemblance to those of Poseidonia. Possibly a treaty of friendship between Sybaris, its allies and the Serdaioi (an unknown people) dates to this new foundation, because Poseidonia was the guarantor of this treaty. Ultimately the Sybarites were again driven off by the Krotoniates from their new city in 446/445 BC.

Final expulsion in 445 BC 
What happened next is again uncertain. According to Diodorus the Sybarites requested Sparta and Athens to help them reoccupy their city. With the help of Athens and some other cities in the Peloponnese they founded the city of Thurii not far from the site of Sybaris. Soon a conflict arose between the Sybarites and the other colonists of Thurii over the privileges the Sybarites enjoyed. Practically all of the Sybarites were killed by the other colonists, who were more numerous and powerful. Some of the Sybarites managed to flee and founded Sybaris on the Traeis shortly after 444 BC.

The request for help from the Sybarites must have been made after the conclusion of the Thirty Years' Peace in the early spring of 445 BC, for it would not have made sense to ask for help while Sparta and Athens were still at war with each other. While Diodorus identifies only one expedition for the foundation of Thurii, Strabo writes that the Athenian and other Greek colonists first lived in Sybaris and only founded Thurii after the expulsion of the Sybarites. Modern scholarship corroborates Strabo's account and identifies two expeditions. In 446/445 BC Athens sent its expedition to reinforce the existing population of Sybaris. In the summer of 445 BC the collision between the two groups led to the downfall of the Sybarites. In 444/443 BC the Athenians and other new colonists then turned the city into a new foundation called Thurii. The city received a new democratic constitution which made provisions for ten tribes, but which did not include the Sybarites.

Legacy 
Unlike Herodotus, Diodorus and earlier ancient Greek writers, later authors from the Roman period denounced the Sybarites. Aelianus, Strabo and especially Athenaeus saw the destruction of Sybaris as divine vengeance upon the Sybarites for their pride, arrogance, and excessive luxury. Athenaeus is the richest source for anecdotes about the Sybarites. According to him they invented the chamber pot and pioneered the concept of intellectual property to ensure that cooks could exclusively profit from their signature dishes for a whole year. They always traveled in chariots, but would still take three days for a journey of one day. The roads to villas in the countryside were roofed over and canals transported wine from vineyards to cellars near the sea.  A fragment of the comedian Metagenes he quotes has a Sybarite boasting about literal rivers of food flowing through the city.

Not only does Athenaeus provide a great deal of examples to show the decadence of Sybarites, he also argues that their excessive luxury and sins led to their doom. According to Athenaeus ambassadors of the Sybarites (one of whom was named Amyris) consulted the oracle of Delphi, who prophesied that war and internal conflict awaited them if they would honor man more than the gods. Later he cites Phylarchus, who would have written that the Sybarites invoked the anger of Hera when they murdered thirty ambassadors from Kroton and left them unburied. He also cites Herakleides as attributing the divine wrath to the murder of supporters of Telys on the altars of the gods. Herakleides supposedly mentioned that the Sybarites attempted to supplant the Olympic Games by attracting the athletes to their own public games with greater prizes. The most direct link between luxury and corruption is evident in Athenaeus' anecdote about the defeat of the Sybarites: to amuse themselves the Sybarite cavalrymen trained their horses to dance to flute music. When the Krotoniate army had their flute players make music the horses of the Sybarites ran over to the Krotoniates along with their riders. Strabo gives the "luxury and insolence" of the Sybarites as the reason for their defeat. Claudius Aelianus attributes the fall of Sybaris to its luxury and the murder of a lutenist at the altar of Hera.

Vanessa Gorman gives no credence to these accounts because grave sins followed by divine retribution were stock elements of fictions at the time. Furthermore, she and Robert Gorman point to Athenaeus as the origin of the embellished accounts rather than the historians he cited. He altered details of the original accounts, disguised his own contributions as those of past historians and invented new information to fit his argument that luxury leads to catastrophe. This concept was called tryphé and was a popular belief in his time, at the turn of the 2nd century AD. Peter Green likewise argues that these accounts are most likely the inventions of moralists. He points out the vast natural wealth of the city was the more likely reason it was attacked by Kroton.

This association of Sybaris with excessive luxury transferred to the English language, in which the words "sybarite" and "sybaritic" have become bywords for opulent luxury and outrageous pleasure seeking. One story, mentioned in Samuel Johnson's A Dictionary of the English Language, alludes to Aelianus' anecdote about Smindyrides. It mentions a Sybarite sleeping on a bed of rose petals, but unable to get to sleep because one of the petals was folded over.

Archaeology 

The earliest archaeological exploration in the last quarter of the 19th century failed to find the location of Sybaris. Finding the location was difficult because the site had been buried over time by more than four meters of alluvial sediment from the Crati delta. The location of the city was found only after a massive core drilling project had been undertaken from the early to mid-1960s. The archaeological site is located about 2.5 kilometers west of the present Gulf of Taranto coastline. The excavations were difficult because the human structures lay below groundwater level. It was found that the later cities of Thurii and Copia were built partially above Sybaris. An archaeological museum was built near the site.

See also
 List of ancient Greek cities

Notes

References

Sources

Primary sources

Secondary sources

Further reading

External links

Official website 
Coins of Sybaris on WildWinds.com
Coins of Sybaris on Magna Graecia Coins

720s BC
8th-century BC establishments in Italy
Achaean colonies of Magna Graecia
Ancient Troezen
Archaeological sites in Calabria
Former populated places in Italy
Cassano all'Ionio
National museums of Italy
Ruins in Italy